The BCR Open Romania Ladies is a tennis tournament held in Bucharest, the capital of Romania. This is a WTA 125 event with a prize money of $115,000. It started off being a $25,000 ITF event back in 2007 but has slowly increased the prize money and is played on outdoor clay courts.

Previous names
2007–2008: Gaz de France Stars Bucharest
2009: GDF Suez Open Romania
2010: Ruxandra Dragomir Open
2022: Țiriac Foundation Trophy

Past finals

Singles

Doubles

See also
 List of tennis tournaments

References

External links

 Official website 

 
Tennis tournaments in Romania
Clay court tennis tournaments
ITF Women's World Tennis Tour
Recurring sporting events established in 2007
Recurring sporting events disestablished in 2012
Defunct tennis tournaments in Europe
Defunct sports competitions in Romania
2007 establishments in Romania
2012 disestablishments in Romania